Piekoszów  is a city in Kielce County, Świętokrzyskie Voivodeship, in south-central Poland. It is the seat of the gmina (administrative district) called Gmina Piekoszów.

The city has a population of 3,200

References

Villages in Kielce County
Kielce Governorate
Kielce Voivodeship (1919–1939)